Endres is a German surname. The name is well established and quite distinguished in the Franconia region in the Southern German State of Bavaria. This area is likely where the name originated, as there are also spelling variations in this area such as Endress, and more rarely Endrass. Although the name is not restricted to this area exclusively, as families have moved over the centuries to other regions within Germany, the majority are still found in Franconia and the southern and western areas of Germany.

Notable people with the surname include:

Surname Endres
Daniel Endres (born 1985), German footballer
Gustavo Endres (born 1975), Brazilian volleyball player
Hans Endres (1911–2004), German academic and writer
Hans-Edgar Endres (1894–?), German bobsledder
John Endres, American civil engineer
Karl Endres (1911–1993), German baseball player
Marc Endres (born 1991), German footballer
Matthias Endres (1852–?), American lawyer and politician
Michael Endres (born 1961), German classical pianist
Murilo Endres (born 1981), Brazilian volleyball player
Theodor Endres (1876–1956), German general
Thomas Endres (born 1969), German fencer
 (1730-1791), German Theologian

Surname Endress 
Georg Endress (1924-2008), German-Swiss entrepreneur

Surname Endrass
Engelbert Endrass (1911-1941), German U-boat Commander

See also
7361 Endres, a main-belt asteroid

German-language surnames
Surnames from given names